Myingyan Prison in Myingyan District was known as the most infamous detention center among Burma's political prisoners for its atrocities from early 1990s to October 1999 when the International Committee of the Red Cross (ICRC) was granted an access to the prison. Before the ICRC visit, several political prisoners died due to starvation and torture.

Prisoners 
Currently, a number of political prisoners including the ex-military intelligence officials are still serving long prison sentences and only three political detainees from the prison were released on April 17, 2011, when the new government granted an amnesty reducing the prison sentences by one year.

Some of the most prominent political prisoners are KIA commando Zaw Saing, ex-Gen Khing Aung, ex-Gen Thein Swe and Myo Min Htike, a student activist serving a 53-year jail term since 1998.

Atrocities 
One account describing prison practices include an order for a group of political prisoners to spend hours catching flies, shining the iron cell doors, and polishing the bare ground in their cells with the base of a small bottle. There are also instances when prisoners were interrogated for months and being they are transferred to prison or isolation cells and subjected to repeated degradation. The oppressive heat also often aggravate the passions inside the prison. For instance, it was said that parched criminals turn the prison into the worst of worst, smashing jailed politicians while wardens looked on laughing. The violence was recently demonstrated in the case of a 2016 prison melee where inmates engaged in violent clash after one prisoner was ordered into solitary confinement.

References 

Mandalay Region
Prisons in Myanmar